Seed is an upcoming massively multiplayer sandbox simulation video game in development by Klang Games, which began initial production in October 2016.
According to Klang Games, the game is not connected to, or a remake of, Seed, developed by Runestone Game Development, which closed in 2006.

Plot 
Players are tasked with colonizing a large-scale, exoplanet through collaboration, conflict, and other player-to-player interaction.

Gameplay 
Players must manage multiple colonists and create their routines, allowing them to develop their community and progress on their own organically. Each AI-controlled colonist can be given priorities or various tasks for survival. Players can collaborate with one other to form larger colonies. These large colonies can then form their own governments, rules, or taxes, and eventually, become cities.
When a player is logged off, their colonists will still function within the game. However, players will also have the ability to defer the control of their characters to other players.

In-game politics 
In May 2016, it was announced that the Professor of Law at Harvard Law School, Lawrence Lessig, is working with Klang to create the game's political structure.
Professor Lessig is creating a platform where players can choose from different forms of governance to apply to a player colony. The options range from simple forms of government to a monarchy or different forms of complex democracies. Lessig noted that players shouldn't be burdened with political structure until they need it.
In addition, Lessig noted that he is not interested in pushing his personal views within the game.

Development 
Klang is utilizing the cloud-based operating system created by Improbable, SpatialOS, which allows Seed to be a persistent, continuously running simulation, with all Seed game logic running and living on a single shard server.
The game's low polygon art style direction is led by 3D animator Eran Hilleli.

Reception 
Seed has been described by Rock, Paper, Shotgun as “'RimWorld but multiplayer or maybe 'The Sims but on another planet where the other Sims families don’t like you'.”

References

External links 
 

Upcoming video games
Massively multiplayer online games
Multiplayer video games
Open-world video games
Construction and management simulation games
Simulation video games